Guy Lafitte (12 January 1927 – 10 June 1998) was a French jazz saxophonist.

Career
A native of Saint-Gaudens, Haute-Garonne, France, he worked with Mezz Mezzrow from 1951 to 1952 and Big Bill Broonzy in 1951. In 1954 he made Paris his home and worked with Lionel Hampton and Emmett Berry. He also worked with Bill Coleman and Wild Bill Davis.

Discography

As leader
 Blue and Sentimental (Le Club Francais, 1955)
 Les Classiques du Jazz Vol. 2 with Andre Persiany (Columbia, 1958)
 Melodies (Columbia, 1958)
 Sax: 10 Succes (Pathe, 1960)
 Sax and Strings (Columbia, 1963)
 Jambo! (RCA Victor, 1968)
 Blues (Vega, 1969)
 Blues in Summertime (RCA Victor, 1971)
 Sugar and Spice (RCA Victor, 1972)
 Corps et Ame (Black and Blue, 1978)
 Happy! (Black and Blue, 1979)
 Live in France with Arnett Cobb (Black and Blue, 1980)
 Three Men On a Beat with Wild Bill Davis (Black and Blue, 1983)
 Joue Charles Trenet (Black and Blue, 1984)
 Lotus Blossom with Wild Bill Davis (Black and Blue, 2002)
 The Things We Did Last Summer (Black and Blue, 1991)
 Sax Connection (Ida, 1994)
 Crossings with Pierre Boussaguet (EmArcy, 1998)
 Au HCF Paris (Milan, 2002)
 Tenor Abrubt: The Definitive Black & Blue Sessions with Arnett Cobb (Black and Blue, 2003)
 Nice Jazz 1978 (Black and Blue, 2017)

As sideman
With Bill Coleman
 Jazz at Pleyel (Philips, 1952)
 Saint Louis Baby (Columbia, 1956)
 Them Their Eyes (Columbia, 1956)
 Mainstream at Montreux (Black Lion, 1973)
 Really I Do (Black and Blue, 1982)

With others
 Emmett Berry, Emmett Berry and His Orchestra (Columbia, 1955)
 Claude Bolling, French Jazz (Bally, 1956)
 Milt Buckner, Midnight Slows Vol. 7 (Black and Blue, 1977)
 Buck Clayton & Peanuts Holland, Club Session (Le Club Francais 1955)
 Jack Dieval, Jazz Aux Champs-Elysees (Polydor, 1957)
 Golden Gate Quartet, The Golden Gate Quartet (La Voz De Su Amo, 1962)
 Golden Gate Quartet, Spirituals (Columbia, 1964)
 Lionel Hampton, Recorded in Paris 1956 (Swing 1986)
 Mezz Mezzrow, Swingin' with Mezz (Vogue, 1962)
 Sammy Price & Emmett Berry, 1956 Boogie-Woogie a La Parisienne (Pathe Marconi, 2002)
 Brother John Sellers, Blues and Spirituals (Columbia, 1957)
 Brother John Sellers, Brother John Sellers (Columbia, 1958)
 Lucky Thompson, Nothing but the Soul (EMI, 1993)

References

Bibliography
 Richard Morton & Brian Cook, The Penguin Guide to Jazz on CD. Sixth Edition. Penguin, London. 2001

1927 births
1998 deaths
20th-century French musicians
20th-century saxophonists
Big band saxophonists
Black & Blue Records artists
Black Lion Records artists
Cool jazz saxophonists
Jazz tenor saxophonists
Swing saxophonists